The Lutheran Rahlstedt Cemetery is a church-operated historic burial ground in Hamburg, Germany. The cemetery is owned by the Evangelical Lutheran parish church of Old Rahlstedt, Hamburg.

History and description
The cemetery was established in 1829. It has a size of 8.5 hectares and it contains 19.000 graves. The oldest preserved tombstone dates back to 1837, belonging to a woman named Sophie Dorothea Freerks. There is a separate plot adjacent to the cemetery chapel reserved for the pastors. A large marble crucifix dominates the area since 1964, which was originally on the altar of the Old Rahlstedt parish church and later transferred to the cemetery.

Selected notable burials
Notable people buried here include:
 Detlev von Liliencron (1844–1909), German lyric poet and novelist from Kiel

Gallery

References

External links
  
 

Cemeteries in Hamburg
Lutheran cemeteries
Lutheran cemeteries in Germany